Brocchinia maguirei is a species of plant in the genus Brocchinia. This species is endemic to Venezuela.

References

maguirei
Flora of Venezuela